Gales can refer to:

Places
Wales, a country that is part of the United Kingdom, called "Gales" in Spanish, Galician, Basque and Guarani and "País de Gales" in Portuguese
Galeş, a village in Săliște town, Sibiu County, Romania
Gales Addition, Washington, U.S.
Gales Creek (disambiguation)
Gales Ferry, Connecticut, U.S.
Gales Point, Belize
Gales Township, Redwood County, Minnesota, U.S.

People
Dion Gales (born 1985), American footballer
Eric Gales (born 1974), American blues rock guitarist
Henry Gales (1834–1897), English painter
Joseph Gales Sr. (1761–1841), American journalist
Joseph Gales (1786–1860), American journalist and his son
Jules Gales (1924–1988), Luxembourgian footballer
Kenny Gales (born 1972), American footballer
Larry Gales (1936–1995), American jazz double-bassist
Pete Gales (born 1959), Canadian footballer
Seaton Gales (1828–1878), American editor
Simon Gales (born 1964), British contemporary artist
Winifred Gales (1761–1839), American novelist

Other
Gales Brewery
Gale's, a brand of honey and lemon curd in the United Kingdom
Gales, a meteorological event

See also
Gale (disambiguation)

Galesburg (disambiguation)
Galesville (disambiguation)
Gaels